LJP may refer to:

 Langfang railway station, China Railway telegraph code LJP
 Lok Janshakti Party, an Indian political party
Liam James Payne (born 29 August 1993) is an English singer.